Zaouiet Kounta District is a district of Adrar Province, Algeria.

Communes 
The district is further divided into 2 communes:

 Zaouiet Kounta
 In Zghmir

References 

Districts of Adrar Province